"Drive-In" is a song by American rock band the Beach Boys from their 1964 album All Summer Long. It was written by Brian Wilson and Mike Love, although Love was not originally credited until after a 1990s songwriting lawsuit.

Lyrics

"Drive-In" was inspired by the group's outings at the Studio Drive-In in Culver City, California. The song gives the listener advice on how to enter a drive-in theater without paying for admission, among other things, and climaxes with a line alluding to contraception ("If you say you watched the movie, you're a couple of liars / And remember, only you can prevent forest fires").

Composition
Musician Andy Paley commented of the song,

Recording
"Drive-In" was recorded shortly after the release of Little Deuce Coupe in October 1963. Paley shared an anecdote related to the song that occurred during the filming of the 1995 documentary Brian Wilson: I Just Wasn't Made for These Times.

Critical reception
Biographer David Leaf called "Drive-In" "a great example of Brian’s sense of humor working perfectly within a rock 'n' roll song."

References

External links
 

1964 songs
The Beach Boys songs
Songs written by Brian Wilson
Songs written by Mike Love
Song recordings produced by Brian Wilson